Space Delta 13 (DEL 13) is a United States Space Force unit responsible for space education. It offers advanced and developmental space education courses for the Space Force and its joint and allied partners. It was established on 23 August 2021 following the establishment of the Space Training and Readiness Command, the field command to which it reports. It is temporarily headquartered at Maxwell Air Force Base, Alabama, but its final location requires a base selection process.

Structure 
DEL 13 is one of five deltas that reports to the Space Training and Readiness Command. It is composed of the following five subordinate units, three squadrons and two detachments:

List of commanders

References

External links 

 Fact Sheet

Deltas of the United States Space Force